Ferguson Plarre Bakehouses is a family owned and operated bakery business based in Melbourne, Australia.  The business began as two separate entities (Ferguson's Cakes and Plarre's Cakes) with the families coming together to form Ferguson Plarre Bakehouses in 1980. Ferguson Plarre now has 86 stores across Victoria. In 2012, members of the Plarre family bought out the Ferguson's stake and the business remains owned and operated by the Plarre family with Steve Plarre as CEO. There are only a small number of company owned stores now as the majority of stores are run by franchisees.  

The bakery's family history has links to many of Melbourne's culinary institutions (such as Jimmy Watsons).  One of its best-known outlets is in Melbourne's Queen Victoria Market, where locals have purchased the bakery's cakes and pastries for decades.

Ferguson Plarre has won over 100 awards for its baked goods including a gold medal in the Official Great Aussie Pastie Competition 2016 for their Traditional Steak & Potato Tiddly Oggie, "Australia's Champion Dairy Dessert" as judged at the Australian Grand Dairy Awards (Chocolate Moussecake). Overall Cake and Pastry winner at the Victorian Baking Industry Awards as judged by BIAV.

In addition to these awards Ferguson Plarre has been recognised for its response to climate change through sustainable baking and business practices.  In 2007 the bakery opened its environmentally friendly central baking facility in Keilor Park.  There, the tier 1 and 2 emissions from every good baked is carbon offset.  This offset is achieved by the planting of trees as part of the Ferguson Plarre Forest.  2009 saw Ferguson Plarre's environmental action rewarded with the Origin Gold Banksia Award for excellence in sustainability.

More recently the brand introduced a vegan pastry range to meet the demands of the Australian Customer. In 2021, Plarre Foods also began to sell a range of frozen pies and pastries in supermarkets under the Pie Society brand.



History 
Ferguson Plarre Bakehouses is a family owned and operated business. The Fergusons commenced their bakery business in 1901 and the Plarres in 1911.  Both businesses focused mostly in the Northern and Western suburbs of Melbourne, Australia. After decades as separate businesses they merged in 1980 to become 'Ferguson Plarre Bakehouses'. The Ferguson family exited the business in 2012 and Plarre family members now run it.

Sustainability 
Ferguson Plarre supports sustainable business practices. This has influenced the design and construction of a sustainable central baking facility in Keilor Park where 100% of their tier 1 and 2 carbon emissions are offset through tree planting. In addition to their sustainable baking facility, Ferguson Plarre has planted trees to offset greenhouse gas emissions at Mt Worth which is in Victoria, Australia, 15 km south of Warragul. All suppliers to Ferguson Plarre must meet minimum sustainability requirements as established through the company's Sustainable Purchasing Questionnaire.

In collaboration with Sustainability Victoria, Ferguson Plarre Bakehouses launched the first hybrid truck to hit Victoria's streets. Ferguson Plarre's sustainable practices have received a number of awards in relevant sectors.

Awards 
 2016 - Australia's Best Traditional Pastie - National Great Aussie Pastie Competition
 2016 - Australia's Best Decorated Theme Cake - Baking Association of Victoria
 2015 - Australia's Best Decorated Theme Cake - Baking Association of Victoria
 2015 Victoria's Best Sausage Roll - Baking Association of Victoria
 2010 Victorian Manufacturing Hall of Fame
 2009 Origin Gold Banksia Award for excellence in sustainability
 2008 National Great Aussie Pastie (Meat & Vegetable section for Original Tiddly Oggie and Vegetarian section for Wholemeal Tiddly Oggie).
 2008 5 Gold Medals at the Royal Melbourne Fine Food Awards (Family Custard Tart, Baked Cheesecake, Fresh Cream Lamingtons, Buttercake and our Strawberry Cheesecake)
 2008 Australia's best Dairy Dessert (Flourless Chocolate Truffle Cake won the Highest Scoring Dairy Dessert)
 2008 Victorian Baking Industry Awards (1st Place winning biscuits: Classic (dusted) Yo-Yos, Double Choc Rounds and Chocky Bears)
 2007 National Baking Competition (1st Place for Apple Pies & Lamingtons)

Product lines 
 Meat Pies
 Sausage Rolls
 Tiddly Oggies (pasties)
 Cakes
 Slices
 Birthday cakes
 Wedding cakes

References

External links 
 www.fergusonplarre.com.au Company website

Australian companies established in 1901
Restaurants established in 1901
Food and drink companies based in Melbourne
Bakeries of Australia